Luke Swain, (born 24 February 1982 in Penrith, New South Wales) is an Australian former professional rugby league footballer who played in the 2000s and 2010s. He played for the Salford City Reds of Super League.

He joined French club AS Carcassonne for the 2010/11 season.

Swain played from the interchange bench in the Panthers' 2003 NRL grand final-winning team in their 18–6 win over the Sydney Roosters. As 2003 NRL premiers, the Panthers travelled to England to face Super League VIII champions, the Bradford Bulls in the 2004 World Club Challenge. Swain played from the interchange bench in the Penrith's 22-4 loss.

Career highlights
 First grade debut: Penrith Panthers v Canberra Raiders, 5 April 2003, Round 4 at Penrith Football Stadium.
 Premierships: 2003, Penrith Panthers defeated Sydney Roosters, 18–6.

Managerial career
Swain is the current manager of Sydney Shield side The St Mary's Saints.  In The 2017 Sydney Shield season, Swain guided St Mary's to their first ever Sydney Shield premiership with a 34-20 victory over Mounties

References

External links
Gold Coast Titans profile

1982 births
Living people
AS Carcassonne players
Australian rugby league players
Gold Coast Titans players
Penrith Panthers players
Rugby league locks
Rugby league players from Penrith, New South Wales
Rugby league second-rows
Salford Red Devils players